Sources is a web portal for journalists, freelance writers, editors, authors and researchers, focusing especially on human sources: experts and spokespersons who are prepared to answer Reporters' questions or make themselves available for on-air interviews.

Structure
The Sources website is built around a controlled-vocabulary subject index comprising more than 20,000 topics. This subject index is underpinned by an 'Intelligent Search' system which helps reporters focus their searches by suggesting additional subjects related to their search terms. For example, a search for "cancer" will suggest terms such as "chemotherapy", "melanoma", "oncology", "radiation therapy", "tobacco diseases" and "tumours", as well as topics that actually contain the word "cancer".

Each topic reference links in turn to experts and spokespersons on that topic, with profiles describing their expertise and, where relevant, their approach to the issue, along with their phone numbers and other contact information. Sources includes listings for universities and research institutes, non-profit associations and NGOs, government and public sector bodies, businesses, and individuals including academics, public speakers, and consultants.

The subject index and the search menus are being translated into French, Spanish and German to make Sources more of an international resource.

History

Print supplement
Based in Canada, Sources was founded in 1977 as a print directory for reporters, editors, and story producers. It was first published as a supplement to Content magazine, an influential and controversial magazine of journalism criticism. Content, founded by Dick MacDonald in 1970 and published by Barrie Zwicker after MacDonald's death in 1974, frequently took journalists to task for always relying on the same narrow range of sources representing the same conventional points of view for their stories. Zwicker and MacDonald argued in Content and in their book The News: Inside the Canadian Media that there was a “terrible sameness” in the media's coverage of many important issues, and a shutting out of other, potentially valuable, perspectives and sources of information.

Zwicker decided to do something about the problem, and in summer 1977, Content published its first directory issue, called Sources. Billed as “A Directory of Contacts for Editors and Reporters in Canada”, Sources listed “information officers, public relations officers, media relations and public affairs people, and other contacts for groups, associations, federations, unions, societies, institutions, foundations, industries and companies and federal, provincial and municipal ministries, departments, agencies and boards.”

Explaining the rationale behind Sources, Zwicker said that “It’s a cliché that every story has two sides. An untrue cliché. Most have several. The reporter’s challenge is digging out all sides. Sources can help.” From the beginning, Zwicker saw Sources as a public service as well as a tool for journalists. He said that Sources aimed “to help promote a system of information fairness. Communications resources are equivalent to other basic needs – shelter, food, health care, for example. Everyone should have reasonable access to all.” Therefore, he said “we attempt to provide true diversity: access to people in organizations large and small, for-profit and not-for-profit, from low-tech to high-tech, long-established to just-launched.”

Zwicker told users that “within Sources you will find both mainstream and alternative information. Some may consider alternative as off to one side, not quite up to par, more or less second hand. Here at Sources ‘alternative’ is considered differently, considered as authentic and substantial, even if normally less accessible. The surprises, the jarring notes, the flashes of insight, the ‘odd takes’, the pearls of wisdom, the cries de coeur, the avant garde, tomorrow's news, the prophesies, the unfiltered, the exciting, the elsewhere-squelched, the memorable, the eccentric, the thought-out-at-length, the unmentionable in polite company, the outrageous, the uncensored ... these are what ‘alternative’ media offer. So far as we can, we will include the alternative with Sources. Sources’ driving philosophy is flat-out informational democracy enabled by user-friendly technology. The assumption is that there is a significant fraction of Canadians who want to use and benefit from such an information resource. The assumption is that a significant fraction of Canadians want to expand their search for solutions, and deepen their understandings, rather than chant conventional wisdoms (however freshly minted) to each other."

Separate publications
After a few years, Sources become so big that it could no longer fit into Content (the print directory eventually grew to more than 500 pages), and in 1981 it became an independent publication. Content itself eventually folded, but Zwicker continued to devote a substantial editorial section in Sources to coverage of topics of interest to journalists, ranging from practical topics such as grammar, style, fact-checking, photojournalism, copyright, fees for freelancers and self-publishing, to feature articles on the state of journalism and the media, to book reviews. From the early 1990s, Sources began to feature articles about online research, notably the regular feature 'Dean's Digital World' by informatics expert Dean Tudor.

World Wide Web

Content
Sources went on the Internet in 1995 and has been expanding its online portal ever since. It continues to publish a print edition of the directory, primarily for the benefit of freelancers who use it as a source of story ideas, but is now primarily a Web-based resource.

The Sources website includes not only the Sources directory itself, but a separate government directory, Parliamentary Names & Numbers; a directory of the media, Media Names & Numbers; and The Sources HotLink  (www.hotlink.ca), which features articles about media relations and public relations. Also on the site is Fame and Fortune, a directory of awards, prizes, and scholarships available to writers and journalists, and a portal linked into the online archive of Connexions, a library of documents related to alternatives and social justice.

The site also houses Sources Select Resources, a large library of articles and reviews about journalism and the media, spanning a period of more than 30 years.

Controversy
While much of the editorial content has focused on the nitty-gritty of writing, editing and research, Sources has also regularly published articles that have sparked controversy on topics such as censorship and media bias. One campaign waged by Zwicker and others challenged the ethics of journalists accepting free gifts from the people they are supposed to cover. This campaign eventually led Canadian managing editors to agree among themselves that their newspapers would not accept free tickets from travel agencies, resorts, and hotels.

A series of articles by Zwicker on "War, Peace, and the Media" (later collected and published as a booklet) provoked a furor from readers upset by its criticisms of how the media cover U.S. foreign policy. As Zwicker put it in a publisher's letter in the next issue, the "reaction ranged from high praise to angry denunciation." The Toronto Sun newspaper devoted three stories to the series. The columnist Claire Hoy was left "trembling with rage" and the editor Peter Worthington felt "outraged" and a lead editorial denounced Zwicker.

Other controversial articles included one by Wendy Cukier on the public relations battle surrounding proposed gun control legislation, which drew the ire of the gun lobby. Ulli Diemer, who succeeded Zwicker as publisher in 1999, came under attack from the Fraser Institute for his article "Ten Health Care Myths: Understanding Canada’s Medicare Debate”, in which he argued that opponents of public health care were spreading mis-information designed to mislead and frighten the public.

New resources
In keeping with its mandate of encouraging a wide diversity of points of view in the media, Sources has added extra resources over time to help organizations and individuals to be heard. These include a calendar of events open to the media and a news release service which Sources members can use to distribute their statements and communiques via online posting and RSS. The releases are also subject indexed and integrated into the overall search structure for information on the Sources site.

Notes

References

 Basch, Reva. Secrets of the Super Net Searchers: The Reflections, Revelations, and Hard-won Wisdom of 35 of the World’s Top Internet Researchers. Pemberton Press. 1996. 
 Berkman, Robert. The Skeptical Business Searcher: The Information Advisor’s Guide to Evaluating Web Data, Sites and Sources. Information Today, 2004. 
 Bonner, Allan. Media Relations. Briston House. 2003. 
 Carney, William Wray. In the News The Practice of Media Relations in Canada. University of Alberta Press', 2002. 
 Comber, Mary Anne; Mayne, Robert S. The Newsmongers: How The Media Distort the Political News. 1987. McClelland & Stewart
 Cormack, Paul G.; Shewchuk, Murphy (eds.) The Canadian Writers’ Guide. 13th Edition. Canadian Authors Association. Fitzhenry & Whiteside, 2003. 
 Hackett, Robert A.; Gruneau, Richard. The Missing News: Filters and Blind Spots in Canada’s Press. Newswatch Canada. Canadian Centre for Policy Alternatives & Garamond Press, 2000
 Hackett, Robert A. News and Dissent: The Press and The Politics of Peace in Canada. 1993. Ablex.
 Hackett, Robert A.; Zhao, Yuezhi. Sustaining Democracy? Journalism and the Politics of Objectivity. Garamond Press. 1998. 
 Kashmeri, Zuhair. The Gulf Within: Canadian Arabs, Racism, & The Gulf War. James Lorimer. 1991
 MacDonald, Dick; Zwicker, Barrie. The News: Inside the Canadian Media. Deneau. 1982. 
 Mann, Thomas. The Oxford Guide to Library Research. Oxford University Press. 1998. 
 Manson, Katherine; Hackett, Robert; Winter, James; Gutstein, Donald; Gruneau, Richard (eds.) Blindspots in the News? Project Censored Canada Yearbook. Project Censored Canada. 1995.
 McGuire, Mary; Stilborne, Linda; McAdams, Melinda; Hyatt, Laurel. The Internet Handbook for Writers, Researchers, and Journalists. Trifolium Books. 1997, 2002. 
 Miljan, Lydia; Cooper, Barry Cooper. Hidden Agendas: How Journalists Influence the News. University of British Columbia Press. 2003. 
 Miller, John. Yesterday’s News: Why Canada’s Daily Newspapers are Failing Us. Fernwood Publishing, 1999
 Ouston, Rick. Getting the Goods: Information in B.C.: How to Find It, How to Use It. New Star Books, 1990
 Patriquin, Larry. Inventing Tax Rage: Misinformation in the National Post. Fernwood Publishing, 2004. 
 Soderlund, Walter C.; Hildebrandt, Kai (eds.) Canadian Newspaper Ownership in the Era of Convergence: Rediscovering Social Responsibility. University of Alberta Press. 2005, 
 Tudor, Dean. Finding Answers: Approaches to Gathering Information. McClelland & Stewart Inc., Toronto. 1993.
 Ward, Stephen J.A. The Invention of Journalism Ethics: The Path to Objectivity and Beyond. McGill-Queen's University Press. 2004. 
 Winter, James. Media Think. Black Rose Books. 2002. 
 Zwicker, Barrie. War, Peace and the Media. Sources. 1983, 1985

External links
 
 Sources Select Resources
 Sources Select News
 Sources Calendar
 Fame & Fortune
 The Sources HotLink
 Connexions Information Sharing Services

Directories
Canadian journalism organizations
Knowledge markets
Online databases
Web directories
Canadian news websites